The Forest Rangers is a 1942 American adventure film made by Paramount Pictures, directed by George Marshall, written by Harold Shumate based on a story by Thelma Strabel, and starring Fred MacMurray, Paulette Goddard, and Susan Hayward. The film was notable for introducing the song "Jingle Jangle Jingle" which became a huge hit for Kay Kyser.

Plot
When a fire breaks out, forest ranger Don Stuart gets help from men who work for mill owner Tana Mason, a woman he fondly calls "Butch." In the air helping is pilot Frank Hatfield, whose love for Tana is not mutual. Everyone assumes that Tana and Don will end up together.

Once the blaze is out, Don concludes that arson was involved. Twig Dawson, a lumber man with grievances against Tana, is the likely culprit. While the investigation continues, Don attends a parade in town where a firecracker startles a horse carrying Celia Huston, who is thrown. It is love at first sight and Don marries Celia a day later, stunning Tana.

Twig is taken into custody when another fire breaks out. Tana and Celia are trapped together while Don realizes that Twig could not be responsible. He intends to parachute from Frank's plane into the area where the women are stranded, only to discover that Frank is the one who committed the arson. Don is able to narrowly escape and get to Tana and Celia in time.

Cast

References

External links

1942 films
Paramount Pictures films
1942 adventure films
Films scored by Victor Young
Films directed by George Marshall
Films set in forests
American adventure films
1940s American films